Ercilia Pepín (December 7, 1886 – June 14, 1939) was a teacher, feminist, and equal rights activist from the Dominican Republic. She dedicated herself to the welfare and preservation of the Dominican nation through education.

Biography
Ercilia Pepin was born on December 7, 1886 in the city of Santiago de los Caballeros. She was the daughter of Don Jose Pepin and Edelmira Star. By her father, she is the niece of the legendary political and military figure Perico Pepin.

When Ercilia he was five years of age, she lost her mother and from that moment her grandmother Carlota was responsible for her upbringing. Her family was prominent in the political circles of the country, which led to Ercilia received basic lessons in social studies, math, French, physics and other disciplines.

Career
In 1900, at the early age of 14, she formally began her career as a teacher in an all girls' school in the Santiago neighborhood of Nibaje. In 1906 she was appointed director of the Superior de Señoritas school. In 1908 she assumed the post of teacher in the areas of Mathematics, Physical and Natural Sciences in the College for Women, replacing her teacher Cucurullo Salvador.

Ercilia adopted the system taught by the famed educator Eugenio María de Hostos, which at that time was beginning to spread throughout the country. With this method she could better organize the lessons and apply disciplinary rules of extraordinary importance. Among the measures introduced was the use of school uniform for the first time in Dominican Republic and the respectful treatment of teachers and students, denoted by the standard to address the students with the title of "ladies", which counted the own students and teachers.

Ercilia urged respect for national symbols, the flag and coat of arms; she also prompted some musicians to compose and sing hymns in honor of these symbols. She also added as part of the method de Hostos, a Primary School Manual Arts or Crafts, as was common to say, not only, a Gymnasium and a school choir, but to also introduce subjects such as drawing and cartography. Most of these measures were criticized at first, by sectors of society, who did not understand or accept the then-innovative measures of Ercilia, who was barely 25 years old.

Activism
Ercilia Pepin was the first Dominican woman to start the feminist movements in the country, raising her voice in defense of equal rights throughout country. She also deepened her patriotic and nationalist campaign, promoting awareness of the teaching of true moral and civic values.

In August 1913, with honors, she received the title of Maestra Normal, at her native school. Immediately thereafter she begins a campaign of complaints to Congress, in order to be installed in a professional Santiago Community College. In 1915, by resolution of Congress, she began teaching at the institute. In this institute Mathematics, Law, Medicine, Pharmacy and Dentistry were taught. Ercilia became a medical student in that school. Shortly after the military intervention of the United States in 1916, the Institute had to close its doors.

Ercilia opposed the U.S. intervention, and made several conferences to inform the people of what was happening in the country; in their subjects, there was talk of love of country Duarte, and love the land. Ercilia required the Americans to sing the national anthem and fly the flag, extending these customs to all citizens, regardless of sex or age.

Later years
When the withdrawal of interventionist troops on occurred on July 24, 1924, Ercilia Pepin headed by the country's authorities act the national flag act at the Fortress of San Luis. The tricolor was used in the fort, was concocted young students of the institute. One hundred ladies of the city, kneeling, viewed lower the flag of the Stars and Stripes and the flag up airy February 27, 1844.

In 1925 she was declared by the City of Santiago Meritorious Daughter. In 1930, major political events that opened the way to power the head of the Army, Rafael Leonidas Trujillo occurred. Trujillo had great admiration and respect for Ercilia. When dying sloth Professor Andrew in 1932, the product of a criminal ambush by gunmen government Ercilia placed a flag given to him at half- Trujillo, in mourning. Trujillo responded and ordered the impeached as director of the School campus.

Ercilia continued their teaching in a private school, while she was gravely ill with a kidney disease. Trujillo took care of the expenses of her illness.

Ercilia Pepin died on June 14, 1939. Today in Dominican Republic she is considered as one of the outstanding women in the country.

A metro station in Santo Domingo is named after her.

References

1886 births
1939 deaths
Dominican Republic activists
Dominican Republic women activists
People from Santiago de los Caballeros